= Padesur =

Coordinates: 15°33′N 75°19′E

- Village
- Location in Karnataka, India Padesur (India)
- Country: India
- State: Karnataka
- District: Dharwad

Government
  - Body: Village Panchayat

Population (2011)
  - Total: 2,228

Languages
  - Official: Kannada
- Time zone: UTC+5:30 (IST)
- ISO 3166 code: IN-KA
- Vehicle registration: KA
- Website: karnataka.gov.in

Padesur is a village in Dharwad district of Karnataka, India.

== Demographics ==
As of the 2011 Census of India there were 433 households in Padesur, and a total population of 2,228, consisting of 1,161 males and 1,067 females. There were 237 children ages 0–6.
